St Andrew's Church, Chesterton is a Church of England parish church in Chesterton, Cambridge. It is a Grade I listed building. A church was first recorded on this site around 1200. The church was presented in 1217 to the papal legate, Cardinal Guala, by Henry III of England, in gratitude for the legate's attempt at reconciliation during domestic unrest at the end of the reign of King John. In 1436 Henry VI seized ownership of the church and associated buildings from the Italian Abbey of Vercelli and gave it to King's Hall, Cambridge which later became Trinity College, Cambridge. Trinity College is the church's patron to this day; with many vicars of Chesterton being fellows of Trinity.

Built from flint, rubble and clunch with ashlar on the tower and buttresses. The tower has two bell-openings (decorated) and is topped by a spire lit by small windows. The spire was restored in 1847 and the spare, tower and chancel in 1968.  The windows are in the perpendicular style, except the  easternmost window in the south aisle which is decorated.

The interior has an aisled nave with arcades of seven bays, each with octagonal piers dating from the 14th century on each side there is a clerestory dating from the 15th century. Above this lies the roof is supported by stone corbels, and below the floor is laid with polychromatic tiles. The church is lit via stained glass dating from the 19th century. There is a 15th-century Doom painting above the chancel arch.

Outside, the graveyard is of interest and is listed. On the church's north wall, a plaque to Anna Maria Vassa (died 1797), eldest daughter of the former slave and anti-slavery campaigner Olaudah Equiano, commemorates a link with the abolition of the  slave trade.

Nearby are the Old Manor House to the south, the vicarage (1820) to the east and Chesterton Tower is a little further away just off Chapel Lane.

References

Andrew's Church, Chesterton
Grade I listed buildings in Cambridge